Swinging Kicks is a 1957 album by the jazz arranger Buddy Bregman. The album was released as I Love Listening to Buddy Bregman by HMV in the United Kingdom.

Reception
Scott Yanow reviewed the album for AllMusic and wrote that it was "Because many of the selections are brief (seven are under two minutes) and due to the intriguing titles, this seems a bit like a soundtrack to a film that was never made. However, few of the tracks seem truncated and there are some excellent solos along the way, particularly from Ben Webster, Conte Candoli, Herb Geller, Bud Shank, and Paul Smith. ...Bregman uses some of the top West Coast jazz players and various musicians who were on Verve at the time, with Stan Getz making a guest appearance on "Honey Chile". Recommended".

Track listing
 "Wild Party" – 3:22
 "Melody Room" – 1:24
 "Bada Blues" – 2:56
 "Kicks Swings" – 2:11
 "Melody Lane" – 1:51
 "Lost Keys" – 1:51
 "Go Kicks" – 1:25
 "Gage Flips" – 2:13
 "Derek's Blues" – 2:49
 "Mulliganville" – 1:35
 "Terror Ride" – 2:15
 "The Flight" – 3:46
 "Tom's Idea" – 2:02
 "Melodyville" – 1:56
 "Honey Chile" – 2:33
 "End of Party" – 1:18
 "Kicks Is In Love" – 3:18

Personnel
Buddy Bregman – arranger, conductor
Bud Shank, Herb Geller – alto saxophone
Jimmy Giuffre – baritone saxophone
Al Hendrickson – guitar
Ben Webster, Bob Cooper, Georgie Auld, Stan Getz – tenor saxophone
Frank Rosolino, George Roberts, Lloyd Ulyate, Milt Bernhart – trombone
Conrad Gozzo, Conte Candoli, Maynard Ferguson, Pete Candoli, Ray Linn – trumpet
André Previn, Paul Smith – piano
Joe Mondragon – double bass
Alvin Stoller, Stan Levey – drums

References

1957 albums
Albums arranged by Buddy Bregman
Albums produced by Norman Granz
Albums recorded at Capitol Studios
Buddy Bregman albums
Verve Records albums